The 2003 CPISRA Football 7-a-side World Championships was the world championship for men's national 7-a-side association football teams. CPISRA stands for Cerebral Palsy International Sports & Recreation Association. Athletes with a physical disability competed. The Championship took place in Argentina from 8 to 22 October 2003.

Football 7-a-side was played with modified FIFA rules. Among the modifications were that there were seven players, no offside, a smaller playing field, and permission for one-handed throw-ins. Matches consisted of two thirty-minute halves, with a fifteen-minute half-time break. The Championships was a qualifying event for the Athens 2004 Paralympic Games.

Participating teams and officials

Qualifying 
The following teams are qualified for the tournament:

Venues 
The venues to be used for the World Championships were located in Buenos Aires.

Group stage

Group 1

Group 2

Finals 
Position 11-12

Position 9-10

Position 7-8

Position 5-6

Position 3-4

Final

Statistics

Ranking

See also

References

External links 
 Cerebral Palsy International Sports & Recreation Association (CPISRA)
 International Federation of Cerebral Palsy Football (IFCPF)

2003 in association football
2003
2002–03 in Argentine football
Paralympic association football
CP football